Loren Dean (born July 31, 1969) is an American actor. He has appeared on stage and in feature films.

Early life
Loren Dean Jovicic was born July 31, 1969, in Las Vegas, Nevada. His parents divorced when he was a small child. His mother won custody of Loren, and the family moved to Los Angeles, California. When visiting his father, the two often went to the movies—which Dean says led to his love of film. His childhood was a difficult one, and he ran away from home when he was 16 years old. He graduated from Santa Monica High School in Santa Monica, California, in 1986.

Dean moved to New York City to pursue an acting career. After two years, a friend introduced him to an agent, and he  began appearing in stage plays in New York. He won a Theatre World Award in 1989 for his Off Broadway debut in the play Amulets Against the Dragon Forces at the Circle Repertory Company. He is a playwright and one of Academy Award-winning screenwriter John Patrick Shanley's favorite actors, having appeared in many of the author's plays, notably 4 Dogs and a Bone and Beggars in the House of Plenty.

During his time in New York, Dean became an animal lover.

Film career
Dean's first film was 1988's Plain Clothes. He made his big break a year later, cast as a bad ex-boyfriend in Say Anything... starring John Cusack. His third film, the 1991 crime drama Billy Bathgate, cast him opposite Nicole Kidman, Dustin Hoffman and Bruce Willis.

Dean was also lauded for his role as a cocaine-addicted, has-been movie star who is accidentally re-launched on the road to fame and fortune by a fan in Starstruck. Variety noted that Dean "nails his role with precision". He was also lauded for his performance as a mysterious small-town psychologist in Mumford (1999).

Much of his acting career, however, has been in supporting roles. His films include Apollo 13 (1995), How to Make an American Quilt (1995), Gattaca (1997), Enemy of the State (1998) and Space Cowboys (2000). Dean has appeared in a number of independent films (such as The War Bride and The Poker Club) and several well-received television miniseries (such as The Bronx Is Burning). He has also played Russ, the brother of Temperance "Bones" Brennan on the TV series Bones. He also had a recurring role on the 2010 crime drama Terriers. In 2011, Dean starred in the made-for-television movie Who Is Simon Miller? The film, which aired on NBC, was financed by Procter & Gamble and Walmart as one of their quarterly "Family Movie Night" films. Each film is designed to present wholesome values with almost no violence, sex, or drug use.

Dean has supported filmmakers behind the scenes as well. In 1999, he was a juror for the third annual Shorts International Film Festival.

Impersonated by conman
Loren Dean has been repeatedly impersonated by suspected con artist Loren Dean Breckenridge III. The Sheriff's Department in Orange County, California, has accused Breckenridge of impersonating Dean and defrauding drug rehabilitation centers across the United States, as well as committing the theft of $75,000 in Marin County, California. Breckenridge was later arrested for impersonating White Zombie drummer Phil Buerstatte.

Partial filmography

 1988 Plain Clothes as Matt Dunbar
 1989 Say Anything... as Joe
 1991 Billy Bathgate as Billy "Bathgate" Behan
 1992 1492: Conquest of Paradise as Older Ferdinand Columbus
 1993 JFK: Reckless Youth (TV miniseries) as Joe Kennedy Jr.
 1993 The American Clock as Jude
 1995 The Passion of Darkly Noon as Jude
 1995 Apollo 13 as John Aaron - EECOM Arthur
 1995 How to Make an American Quilt as Preston
 1996 Mrs. Winterbourne as Steve DeCunzo
 1997 Rosewood as James Taylor
 1997 The End of Violence as Dean "Doc" Brock
 1997 Gattaca as Anton Freeman
 1998 Starstruck as Kyle Carey
 1998 Enemy of the State as NSA Agent Loren Hicks
 1999 Mumford as Mumford
 2000 Space Cowboys as Ethan Glance
 2001 The War Bride as Joe
 2005 Numbers (TV Series) as Paul Stevens
 2006-2008 Bones (TV Series) as Russ Brennan
 2007 The Bronx Is Burning (TV miniseries) as Fran Healy
 2008 The Poker Club as Curtis Wilcox
 2008 Reservations as Marc
 2009 Middletown (Short) as Adam Tanner
 2010 Conviction as Rick
 2011 Who is Simon Miller? (TV movie) as Simon Miller
 2018 The Mule as Agent Brown
 2019 Ad Astra as Donald Stanford

References

External links

Theatre World Award winners

American male film actors
American male stage actors
American male television actors
Living people
Male actors from Los Angeles
People from Greater Los Angeles
1969 births